Gliese 687, or GJ 687 (Gliese–Jahreiß 687) is a red dwarf in the constellation Draco. This is one of the closest stars to the Sun and lies at an approximate distance of less than 15 light years. Even though it is close by, it has a magnitude of about 9, so it can only be seen through a moderately sized telescope. Gliese 687 has a high proper motion, advancing 1.304 arcseconds per year across the sky. It has a net relative velocity of about 39 km/s. It is known to have a Neptune-mass planet. Old books and articles refer to it as Argelander Oeltzen 17415.

Properties
Gliese 687 has about 40% of the Sun's mass and nearly 50% of the Sun's radius. Compared to the Sun, it has a slightly higher proportion of elements with higher atomic numbers than helium. It appears to have a rotation of 60 days and to be somewhat chromospherically active.

It displays no excess of infrared radiation that would indicate orbiting dust.

Planetary system

In 2014, it was discovered to have a planet, Gliese 687 b, with a minimum mass of 18.394 Earth masses (which makes it comparable to Neptune), an orbital period of 38.14 days, a low orbital eccentricity and inside the habitable zone. Another Neptune mass planet candidate was discovered in 2020, in a further out and much colder orbit.

X-ray source
Gliese 687 is a solitary red dwarf that emits X-rays.

See also
 List of nearest stars

References

Notes

External links
 NEXXUS page

Draco (constellation)
Local Bubble
M-type main-sequence stars
086162
0687
Planetary systems with two confirmed planets
BD+68 0946